Songs from the Rain is the third album by the Irish band Hothouse Flowers. It was released in 1993.

The album peaked at No. 7 on the UK Albums Chart. The band promoted it by playing the Another Roadside Attraction festival, and then opening for Midnight Oil.

Production
The album was produced by Stewart Levine. Two of its songs were cowritten with Dave Stewart; Will Jennings also contributed to Songs from the Rain.

Critical reception

Rolling Stone wrote: "Like Simple Minds, another spiritually inspired act that succumbed to bombast, Hothouse Flowers seem unsure how to express their religiosity without alienating a potential new audience." The Edmonton Journal determined that the album "captures the essence of contemporary Irish soul." The Chicago Tribune declared that the Hothouse Flowers prove that they remain "among the most emotional, compelling and imaginative of the new Celtic rock bands."

The Los Angeles Times concluded that "the best moments are disarming expressions of faith that are as mystical and spirit-lifting as the works of Van Morrison and the Waterboys." The Guardian noted that "the Flowers have begun mining a potentially rewarding vein of blues-gospel-folk-funk." The Philadelphia Inquirer lamented that "Celtic soul can be a mighty tepid cup of tea."

AllMusic wrote that "while Songs From the Rain is the band's most musically diverse collection, it is hampered by an inconsistent set of material." Hot Press''' Pat Carty described the album as "one of the'' great Irish records".

Track listing

Charts

References

1993 albums
Hothouse Flowers albums
London Records albums